Elmer W. Holm (January 14, 1906 – October 8, 1992) was an American football player and coach of football and basketball.  He was the 21st head football coach at Washburn University in Topeka, Kansas, serving for six seasons, from 1936 to 1941, and compiling a record of 23–31–3. Holm was also the head basketball coach at Washburn from 1933 to 1936, tallying a mark of 21–36.

Following his tenure at Washburn, Holm spent the 1942 season as an assistant football coach at his alma mater, the University of Nebraska–Lincoln.

Head coaching record

Football

References

External links
 

1906 births
1992 deaths
American football guards
American men's basketball players
Nebraska Cornhuskers football coaches
Nebraska Cornhuskers football players
Nebraska Cornhuskers men's basketball players
Washburn Ichabods athletic directors
Washburn Ichabods football coaches
Washburn Ichabods men's basketball coaches
College track and field coaches in the United States